The House of David (formally The Israelite House of David) is a religious group founded in Benton Harbor, Michigan, in March 1903. It was co-founded by spouses Benjamin Purnell (1861-1927) and Mary Purnell (1862-1953). The Purnells claimed to be the successors to Joanna Southcott (1750 –1814), an English woman who had built a following as a self-described religious prophetess. The community flourished in the 1910s, but declined and split in various factions in the 1920s, after Benjamin Purnell was accused of sexual immorality. Today, only a handful of members remain.

History

In 1888 the Purnells discovered a group of preachers extolling a man named James Jershom Jezreel as the Sixth Messenger. Jezreel had published a series of sermons in three volumes (842 pages) titled Excerpts from the Flying Roll (1879-1881). While the preachers were in Richmond, Benjamin and Mary joined their group, known as "the Visitation Movement", which was started by a woman named Joanna Southcott, the First Messenger (Angel), in 1792.  While studying the writings of Jezreel they noticed that he said that the Seventh and last Messenger was soon to be on the scene, allegedly mentioned in Revelation 10:7. On March 12, 1895, the Purnells announced that the spirit of Shiloh had grafted with them to become the seventh and last messenger.

The House of David was formed by Benjamin and Mary Purnell in 1903 after settling in Benton Harbor, Michigan. Prior to that, the Purnells lived in Fostoria, Ohio and had two children, one of whom died in a fireworks factory explosion at the age of 17. The Purnells were looked down upon by residents of the city when they decided to forego the funeral due to their beliefs of not having anything to do with the dead.

Purnell, a native of Kentucky, published a book entitled The Church Ages in which he claimed to be the seventh and final messenger of the church ages, as foretold in the book of Revelation. A similar teaching had been promoted a decade earlier by Charles Taze Russel concerning himself may have been an influence on Purnell.

The House of David colony soon had several hundred members. In 1907, the House owned about 1,000 acres, on which the colony harvested fruit from a dozen orchards and cultivated grain. The commune had its own cannery, carpenter shop, coach factory, tailor shop, and steam laundry. They also owned and operated their own electricity plant, providing lighting to the community. It had three brass bands and two orchestras, and a zoological garden.

Accusations arose in the 1920s towards Benjamin F. Purnell by 13 young women testifying, under oath to the courts, that they had sexual relations with the patriarch while still minors.  As soon as this became public knowledge, the Detroit Free Press and other newspapers ran critical articles about Purnell. The news brought national attention to the group. The trial was lengthy, with over 300 witness testimonies and 15,000 pages of documentation. In the end, Purnell was convicted of fraud, but not convicted on the sex charges. Purnell was sick with tuberculosis during the trial and died in 1927, before he could be sentenced.

The sensation created by the trial caused a division in the group. One group, headed by Mary Purnell, remained together and in 1930 were given half of the land next to the original commune. There they rebuilt and reorganized the New Israelite House of David, better known as Mary's City of David; as of 2017, it maintained a handful of members, who kept the premises open to the public.

A second faction maintained the original commune, the Old House of David led by Judge T. H. Dewhirst, had 350 members in 1935, 24 of whom were clergy, and in 1955 had 150 members with 10 clergy. (As of 2010, the group was reported to have three surviving members.) Dewhirst's faction believed that Mary Purnell had no right to usurp authority over the community, as it was led by his own self-appointed council of elders.

Baseball teams

Purnell was a sports enthusiast and encouraged the members of the Israelite Community to play sports, especially baseball, to build physical and spiritual discipline.

In 1913, the Israelite House of David began to play competitive baseball and by 1915, they were following a grueling schedule. The House of David became famous as a barnstorming baseball team which toured rural America from the 1920s through the 1950s, playing amateur and semi-pro teams in exhibition games.  They were motivated by the need to make money for their families and colony back home and by the opportunity to share their beliefs. The team members wore long hair and beards as they played.

By the late 1920s, needing more skilled players, the House began hiring professionals, the most notable being Grover Cleveland Alexander, Satchel Paige, and Mordecai Brown. Some professional players grew their beards out to show respect towards the God of Israel, while others wore false beards. They were known for their skill and played against some of the greatest teams in the country. The House of David played against Major League, Minor League, independent and Negro league teams, with all the same spirit of competition and fair play. At one point, the community had three separate barnstorming teams touring the country, playing and evangelizing wherever they went. The House of David teams were famous for inventing "pepper" baseball tricks, along the lines of the fancy basketball moves of the Harlem Globetrotters.

The House of David continued to sponsor barnstorming teams well into the 1930s and then sponsored weekend semi-professional teams until the 1940s. Mary's City of David sent out barnstorming teams from 1930 until 1940 and then again from 1946 until 1955. Throughout this period, there were numerous teams which bore the House of David name and wore beards. The most famous was probably the Black House of David, an all African-American "Barn-storming" team that played solely against teams of the Negro leagues.

The House of David was the inspiration behind the James Sturm graphic novel, The Golem's Mighty Swing (in which the team was called the "Stars of David") as well as Harry Turtledove's fantasy novel The House of Daniel. The House of David was also featured in a segment of Ken Burns' Baseball and in the movie The Winning Team (1952) about the life of pitcher Grover Cleveland Alexander.

A vintage base ball club (the House of David Echoes BBC) has been honoring the legacy of the House of David teams since 2001, playing vintage base ball under the 1858 rules while growing their beards and playing at historic Eastman Field near Benton Harbor, Michigan. Starting with the 2016 season, the Echoes moved to the original 1914 baseball field at Eden Springs Park, and will continue to use the field for the foreseeable future.

Musical bands

The organization also fielded nationally known musical bands between 1906 and 1927.  These bands toured the country almost non-stop on the three top vaudeville circuits: the Pantages, the Keith and the Orpheum.

Parks
The House of David operated a world-famous zoo and amusement park in Benton Harbor, Michigan. It also established "The Springs of Eden Park" which became a popular Michigan vacation spot in the 1930s. A revamped version opened in late 2011, making it – as of 2015 – one of only a few known American amusement parks to have been successfully reopened.

One of the main attractions at The Springs of Eden Park was the coal powered miniature locomotives, purchased in 1908. Members of the commune originally observed similar locomotives at the 1904 Worlds Fair in St. Louis. The trains were used to carry people to the amusement park from the main entrance to the commune on Britain Avenue. Additional amusement at the park included miniature racing cars, restaurant, penny arcade, pony rides, and dances and shows at the amphitheater. Ring Lardner described the place in his 1916 short story “The Water Cure”, in which some people from the Chicago area are spending the week-end at the beach:

The park closed in the 1970s and the land lay fallow. In 2000, one of the trains was purchased by the Northwest Ohio Railroad Preservation Group, refurbished and in use at a railway museum in Findlay, Ohio.

References

Further reading

External links

House of David Pamphlets and Ephemera at the Newberry Library

1903 establishments in Michigan
History of Michigan
Intentional communities in the United States
New religious movements
Religious organizations established in 1903
Benton Harbor, Michigan